Reginald Teverill Phipps (1906-1976) was an Australian rugby league footballer who played in the 1930s.

Phipps joined St. George for one season in 1931.  

He was previously a state rep rugby union player in 1920's and later coached the Aberdeen, New South Wales rugby club. He returned to the Aberdeen area in 1932, and later served in the AIF in the second World War. 

Phipps died in 1976 at Concord, New South Wales, age 69.

References

St. George Dragons players
Australian rugby league players
Rugby league players from Sydney
Rugby league props
Australian military personnel of World War II
1906 births
1976 deaths